Cryptogonus orbiculus, is a species of lady beetle found in India, Sri Lanka, Nepal, China, Taiwan, Japan, Thailand, Guam, and Northern Mariana Islands.

Description
Elytra black with an oval orange spot on each elytron.

Biology
It is a predator of several whiteflies, aphids and scale insects such as Aspidiotus destructor, Paracoccus marginatus and Aphis gossypii.

References 

Coccinellidae
Insects of Sri Lanka
Beetles described in 1808